Capua cirrhanthes is a species of moth of the family Tortricidae. It is found on Sulawesi in Indonesia.

References

Moths described in 1921
Capua (moth)